Sangeeta Mehta (born 9 September 1966) is an Indian judoka. She competed in the women's heavyweight event at the 1992 Summer Olympics.

References

1966 births
Living people
Indian female judoka
Olympic judoka of India
Judoka at the 1992 Summer Olympics
Place of birth missing (living people)